The list of ship launches in 1772 includes a chronological list of some ships launched in 1772.


References

1772
Ship launches